Andrew Herbert Knoll (born 1951) is the Fisher Research Professor of Natural History and a Research Professor of Earth and Planetary Sciences at Harvard University.  Born in West Reading, Pennsylvania, in 1951, Andrew Knoll graduated from Lehigh University with a Bachelor of Arts in 1973 and received his Ph.D. from Harvard University in 1977 for a dissertation entitled "Studies in Archean and Early Proterozoic Paleontology."  Knoll taught at Oberlin College for five years before returning to Harvard as a professor in 1982.  At Harvard, he serves in the departments of Organismic and Evolutionary Biology and Earth and Planetary Sciences.

Scientific work
Andrew Knoll is best known for his contributions to Precambrian paleontology and biogeochemistry.  He has discovered microfossil records of early life in Spitsbergen, East Greenland, Siberia, China, Namibia, western North America, and Australia, and was among the first to apply principles of taphonomy and paleoecology to their interpretation.  He has also elucidated early records of skeletonized animals in Namibia and remarkable fossils of the Ediacaran Doushantuo Formation, China, preserved in exceptional cellular detail by early diagenetic phosphate precipitation.  Knoll and colleagues authored the first paper to demonstrate strong stratigraphic variation in the carbon isotopic composition of carbonates and organic matter preserved in Neoproterozoic (1000-539 million years ago) sedimentary rocks, and Knoll's group also demonstrated that mid-Proterozoic carbonates display little isotopic variation through time, in contrast to both older and younger successions.

Knoll has longstanding interests in biomineralization, paleobotany, plankton evolution, and mass extinction.  Among other things, Knoll and his colleagues were the first to hypothesize that rapid build-up of carbon dioxide played a key role in end-Permian mass extinction, 252 million years ago. More generally, Knoll uses physiology as a conceptual bridge to integrate geochemical records of environmental change with paleontological records of biological history.  He has also served as a member of the science team for NASA's MER rover mission to Mars.

Honors include membership in the US National Academy of Sciences, the American Academy of Arts and Sciences, the American Philosophical Society, the American Academy of Microbiology, and Foreign Membership in the Royal Society of London and the National Academy of Sciences, India, as well as the Paleontological Society Medal, the Wollaston Medal of the Geological Society (London), the Moore Medal of the Society for Sedimentary Geology, the Oparin Medal of the International Society for the Study of the Origin of Life, the Sven Berggren Prize of the Royal Physiographic Society, Sweden, and both the Walcott and Thompson medals of the US National Academy of Sciences. He received the Phi Beta Kappa Book Award for "Life on a Young Planet: The First Three Billion Years of Evolution on Earth".  In 2018, Knoll received the International Prize for Biology, conferred in Tokyo in the presence of the Emperor and Empress of Japan. In 2022, he received the Crafoord Prize in Geosciences.

Books
 2004 - Life on a Young Planet: The First Three Billion Years of Evolution on Earth. Princeton University Press, Princeton NJ, 277pp.,  
 2007 - The Evolution of Primary Producers in the Sea. Falkowski, P. and A.H. Knoll, Eds. Elsevier, Burlington MA, 441 pp., 
 2012 - Fundamentals of Geobiology. Knoll, A.H., D.E. Canfield and K. Konhauser, Eds. Wiley-Blackwell, Chichester UK, 443 pp., 
 2013 - Biology: How Life Works. Morris, J., D. Hartl, A.H. Knoll, R. Lue, and others. Macmillan. 2nd Edition 2016: ; 4th Edition 2022.
 2021 - A Brief History of Earth: Four Billion Years in Eight Chapters. Knoll, A.H. Custom House, New York NY, 272 pp.,

Selected papers

 Knoll, A.H. and S.B. Carroll (1999) The early evolution of animals: Emerging views from comparative biology and geology. Science 284: 2129–2137.
 Anbar, A.D. and Knoll, A.H. (2002) Proterozoic ocean chemistry and evolution: a bioinorganic bridge? Science 297: 1137–1142.
 Knoll, A.H., Walter, M.R., Narbonne, G.M., and Christie-Blick, N. (2004) A New Period for the Geologic Time Scale. Science 305: 621.
 Squyres, S., and Knoll, A.H. (2005) Outcrop geology at Meridiani Planum: Introduction. Earth and Planetary Science Letters 240: 1-10.
 Knoll, A.H., Javaux, E.J., Hewitt, D., and Cohen, P. (2006) Eukaryotic organisms in Proterozoic oceans. Philosophical Transactions of the Royal Society of London 361B: 1023–1028.
 Tomitani, A., Knoll, A.H., Cavanaugh, C.M., and Ohno, T. (2006) The evolutionary diversification of cyanobacteria: molecular phylogenetic and paleontological perspectives. Proceedings of the National Academy of Sciences, USA 103:5442-5447.
 Knoll, A.H., Bambach, R.K, Payne, J., Pruss, S., and Fischer, W. (2007) A paleophysiological perspective on the end-Permian mass extinction and its aftermath. Earth and Planetary Science Letters 256: 295–313.
 Wilson, J.P, Knoll, A.H., Holbrook, N.M, and Marshall, C.R. (2008) Modeling fluid flow in Medullosa, an anatomically unusual Paleozoic seed plant. Paleobiology 34: 472–493.
 Tosca, N.J., Knoll, A.H., McLennan, S.M. (2008) Water activity and the challenge for life on early Mars. Science 320: 1204–1207.
 Tosca, N.J. and A.H. Knoll (2009) Juvenile chemical sediments and the long term persistence of water at the surface of Mars. Earth and Planetary Science Letters 286: 379–386.
 Pruss, S., S. Finnegan, W.W. Fischer, and A.H. Knoll (2010) Carbonates in skeleton-poor seas: New insights from Cambrian and Ordovician strata of Laurentia. Palaios 25: 73–84.
 Knoll, A.H. (2011) The multiple origins of complex multicellularity. Annual Review of Earth and Planetary Sciences 39: 217–239.
 Knoll, A.H. and W.W. Fischer (2011) Skeletons and ocean chemistry: the long view.  In: J.P. Gattuso and L. Hansson, eds., Ocean Acidification. Oxford University Press, pp. 67–82.
 Parfrey, L., D. Lahr, A.H. Knoll, and L.A. Katz (2011) Estimating the timing of early eukaryotic diversification with multigene molecular clocks. Proceedings of the National Academy of Sciences, USA 108: 13624–13629.
 Cohen, P.A. and A.H. Knoll (2012)  Neoproterozoic scale microfossils from the Fifteen Mile Group, Yukon Territory.  Journal of Paleontology 86: 775–800.
 Knoll, A.H. (2013) Systems paleobiology.  Geological Society of America Bulletin 125: 3-13.
 Bosak, T., A.H. Knoll, and A.P. Petroff (2013) The meaning of stromatolites.  Annual Review of Earth and Planetary Sciences 41: 21–44.
 Sperling, E.A., C.A. Frieder, P.R. Girguis, A.V. Raman,  L.A. Levin, and A.H. Knoll (2013) Oxygen, ecology, and the Cambrian radiation of animals.  Proceedings of the National Academy of Sciences, USA 110: 13446–13451.
 Knoll, A.H. (2014) Paleobiological perspectives on early eukaryotic evolution.  Cold Spring Harbor Perspectives in Biology, doi: 10.1101/cshperspect.a016121.
 Sperling, E.A., A.H. Knoll and P.R. Girguis (2015) The ecological physiology of Earth's second oxygen revolution. Annual Review of Ecology, Evolution and Systematics 46: 215–235.
 Knoll, A.H. and M.J. Follows (2016) A bottom-up perspective on ecosystem change in Mesozoic oceans. Proceedings B, Royal Society, 20161755, DOI: 10.1098/rspb.2016.1755.
 Knoll, A.H., K. Bergmann, and J.V. Strauss (2016) Life: The first two billion years. Philosophical Transactions of the Royal Society, B 371: 20150493, doi.10.1098/rstb.2015.0493.
 Knoll, A.H. and M.A. Nowak (2017) The timetable of evolution. Science Advances 3, DOI: e1603076.
 Muscente, A.D., A. Prabhub, H. Zhong, A. Eleish, M. Meyer, P. Fox, R. Hazen, and A.H. Knoll (2018) Quantifying ecological impacts of mass extinctions with network analysis of fossil communities. Proceedings of the National Academy of Sciences, USA 115: 5217–5222.
 Gilbert, P.U.P.A., S.M. Porter, C.-Y. Sun, S. Xiao, B.M. Gibson, N. Shenkar, and A.H. Knoll (2019)Biomineralization by particle attachment in early animals. Proceedings of the National Academy of Sciences, USA 116: 17659-17665.
 Laakso, T.A., E.A Sperling, D.T. Johnston, and A.H. Knoll (2020) Ediacaran reorganization of the marine phosphorus cycle. Proceedings of the National Academy of Sciences 117: 11961–11967.
 Wordsworth, R., A.H. Knoll, J. Hurowitz, M. Baum, B. Ehlmann, J. Head III, and K. Steakley (2021) An integrated scenario for the climate and redox evolution of Mars. Nature Geoscience 14(3): doi.org/10.1038/s41561-021-00701-8.

Honors
 1967 - Eagle Scout
 1987 - awarded Charles Schuchert Award, presented to a promising paleontologist under 40
 1987 - awarded Walcott Medal for contributions to the study of Precambrian life, in particular the microbial roots of plant evolution
 1996 - awarded honorary doctorate from Uppsala University, Sweden
 1998 - awarded honorary doctorate from Lehigh University
 2003 - awarded Phi Beta Kappa Book Award in Science for Life on a Young Planet
 2005 - awarded Paleontological Society Medal
 2005 - awarded Raymond C. Moore Medal
 2007 - awarded Wollaston Medal , the highest award granted by the Geological Society of London; previous recipients include Charles Darwin and Louis Agassiz
 2012 – awarded Thompson Medal for meritorious research in paleontology and geology
 2013 - foreign fellow, National Academy of Sciences, India
 2014 - awarded honorary doctorate from the University of Chicago
 2014 - awarded the Oparin Medal from the International Society for the Study of the Origin of Life
 2014 - awarded honorary doctorate from the University of Southern Denmark
 2015 - elected a Foreign Member, Royal Society (ForMemRS) of London
 2017 – awarded honorary doctorate from the American Museum of Natural History 
 2018 – awarded the Sven Berggren Prize, Royal Physiographic Society, Sweden 
 2018 - awarded the Geological Society of America's Geobiology and Geomicrobiology Division Award 
 2018 – awarded the International Prize for Biology
 2022 – awarded the Crafoord Prize

References

External links
 Knoll lab webpage
 Harvard webpage
 America's Best 2001: Paleontologist
 Time.com: Fossil Finder
 PBS NOVA Origins: How Did Life Begin?
 Interview with Dr. Knoll on his role in Voyage of Time

1951 births
Living people
Harvard University faculty
American paleontologists
Lehigh University alumni
Harvard University alumni
Wollaston Medal winners
People from Belmont, Massachusetts
People from Berks County, Pennsylvania
Members of the United States National Academy of Sciences
Charles Doolittle Walcott Medal winners
Geobiologists
Foreign Members of the Royal Society
Members of the American Philosophical Society
Fellows of The National Academy of Sciences, India